Edward Everett Hayden (April 14, 1858 – November 17, 1932) was an American naval officer, inventor and meteorologist. He was born in Boston, and was a lifelong naval officer. Early on he was associated with the Smithsonian and the US Geological Survey, but after losing a leg he turned to meteorology. He was considered an expert in sea storms, and wrote many articles about them. In 1888 he helped co-found the National Geographic Society, and served as its vice-president from 1890 until 1893.

References

External links
 
 

1858 births
1932 deaths
National Geographic Society founders
American meteorologists
United States Geological Survey personnel
United States Navy rear admirals